Trent Zelazny (born November 28, 1976) is an American author of crime, horror, and fantastical fiction.  His work includes To Sleep Gently, Fractal Despondency, The Day the Leash Gave Way and Other Stories, Destination Unknown, Butterfly Potion, Too Late to Call Texas, People Person, and Voiceless. His short story "The House of Happy Mayhem" received an honorable mention in Best Horror of the Year 2009, edited by Ellen Datlow.

Author Neil Gaiman said about Trent Zelazny: "A powerful and good writer ... someone who's been through hell and come out, I hope, the other side."

He is the son of Roger Zelazny.

Biography

Zelazny started his publishing career in 1999 with two short stories, "Hope Is an Inanimate Desire" and "Harold Asher and His Vomiting Dogs". In 2001 he began to publish more frequently. In 2002 his story "Lovely Day for Beating an Old Guy" was published in the anthology Random Acts of Weirdness, edited by Brian Knight, which was the first piece to attract attention.

Zelazny's professional debut came with the publication of his short story collection The Day the Leash Gave Way and Other Stories (Fantastic Books: Wilder Publications, 2009), featuring 20 previously published stories and four originals. On July 28, 2014, Black Curtain Press reissued the book with two additional stories, as well as an introduction by Zelazny. Though he had previously sold a novel (Destination Unknown) in 2008, it did not see release until December 2011.

Zelazny moved to Florida, then took some time away from writing, having developed severe alcoholism, as well as having lost his fiancée to suicide. He then attempted suicide himself, but survived, about which he has repeatedly said he is grateful.

In 2011 he returned with the novella Fractal Despondency (Black Curtain Press, 2011), followed quickly by Shadowboxer, To Sleep Gently, and A Crack in Melancholy Time (Crossroad Press, 2011). His novel Destination Unknown (iBooks) was then finally released.

To Sleep Gently received the 2012 Nightmare Award.

In February 2012 Zelazny wrote his first short play, Not Any Little Girl, which premiered in Santa Fe, New Mexico in late April 2012. It later became an Australian bestseller. At the same time he penned the short story "Black Whispers" for the shared world anthology World's Collider, edited by Richard Salter (Nightscape Press). In March, he signed a contract with Nightscape Press for the release of his novella Butterfly Potion, which was released June 30, 2012. Later that same year Black Curtain Press released his novel Too Late to Call Texas on October 31. The novel was then reissued September 24, 2013, with a new cover and an introduction by award-nominated crime and horror author Billie Sue Mosiman. His most recent novel, Voiceless, was released on October 7, 2014, by Evil Jester Press in New York City.

His novelette People Person, released on September 20, 2013, by Black Curtain Press, has been considered by many to be Zelazny's best work to date.

A big movie fan, he also occasionally writes movie "Previews" for the Jean Cocteau Cinema, an independent movie theater in Santa Fe, New Mexico, owned by A Song of Ice and Fire author George R. R. Martin.

Zelazny has also been an on-and-off martial artist since the age of 5, having studied multiple styles including Taekwondo, Tang Soo Do, Aikido, Iron Shirt, Iron Palm, Judo, and has been investigating Wing Chun and Jeet Kune Do.

He has a son from a previous marriage, Corwin Random Zelazny, born June 26, 1996, who is named after characters from his father's classic The Chronicles of Amber series.

Influences
Zelazny cites his biggest influences as those from the pulp era. David Goodis, Cornell Woolrich, Jim Thompson, as well as Joe R. Lansdale, Stephen King, Robert Bloch, Dean Koontz, and Donald E. Westlake as well as his father, Roger Zelazny, and several of the existentialists, most notably Søren Kierkegaard and Jean-Paul Sartre. He also commonly acknowledges Jane Lindskold as his greatest mentor.

Bibliography

Collections
The Day the Leash Gave Way and Other Stories (2009)

Plays
Not Any Little Girl (A One-Act Play) (2012)
The Digital Eidolon That Fits in Your Pocket (A Very Short One-Act Play) (2012)

Plays (as producer)
"Godson" written by Roger Zelazny, produced by Trent Zelazny, Laurel Zelazny, and George RR Martin, directed by Lenore Gallegos.

Editing
In 2012 Zelazny published his first collection as Editor. The collection Mirages: Tales from Authors of the Macabre (Black Curtain Press, 2012) contains work by Tom Piccirilli, E.A. Black, Joseph S. Pulver, Kealan Patrick Burke, Jeffrey Thomas, Edward Morris, Gerald Hausman, Joe R. Lansdale, Billie Sue Mosiman and others.

In April 2013 his second anthology, Dames, Booze, Guns & Gumshoes, was released, a collection of classic crime tales featuring David Goodis, Robert Leslie Bellem, Norman A. Daniels, and many others.

He is currently in the process of co-editing Shadows and Reflections: A tribute to Roger Zelazny with long-time friend Warren Lapine.

Essays
"Isle of Regret" in Amberzine edited by Erick Wujcik (2005)
"How to Write a Short Story for Publication in the New Yorker, by Everette Sage Brown" in The Santa Fe Literary Review edited by Erin Pulsipher and Tom Stevens (2006)
"Afterword" (The Dead Man's Brother) (2009)
"Introduction" in Lovecraft eZine, Issue No. 18, edited by Mike Davis (2012)
"Introduction" in Dames, Booze, Guns & Gumshoes (2013)
"Introduction" in Lovecraft eZine, Issue No. 27, edited by Mike Davis (2013)
"Horseman, Pass By" (Introduction) in Fantasy For Good – A Charitable Anthology, to benefit the Colon Cancer Alliance (2014)
"Introduction" in Sha'Daa Inked, edited by Edward F. McKeown (2016)

Longer works
"A Crack in Melancholy Time" (2011)
"Destination Unknown" (2011)
"Fractal Despondency" (2011)
"Shadowboxer" (2011)
"To Sleep Gently" (2011)
"Butterfly Potion" (2012)
"Too Late to Call Texas" (2012)
"People Person" (2013)
"Voiceless" (2014)

Short fiction

"Harold Asher and His Vomiting Dogs" in Scavenger's Newsletter edited by Janet Fox, 1999
"Hope Is an Inanimate Desire" in Cemetery Sonata edited by June Hubbard, Chameleon Publishing 1999
"Acupuncture" in Shadow of the Marquis (webzine) edited by Alex Severin, 2001
"Chicken Strips" in Delirium Magazine edited by Shane Ryan Staley, 2001
"Lunatic" in Shadow of the Marquis (webzine) edited by Alex Severin, 2001
"The Disappearance of Experimentation" in Shadow of the Marquis (webzine) edited by Alex Severin 2001
"A Dead Man's Burrito" in House of Pain, November/December issue, 2002
"Caught in Etcetera" in Psrhea Magazine, February edited by David Kennedy, 2002
"Competition" in House of Pain webzine, February/March issue edited by Wraith, 2002
"Lovely Day for Beating an Old Guy" in RAW: Random Acts of Weirdness edited by Brian Knight, Catalyst Press 2002
"On My Feet" in Deviant Minds, December issue edited by Rob Parnell, 2002
"The End of the Rainbow" in The Swamp webzine, August issue edited by Pete Allen, 2002
"The Music" in Horrorfind, February issue edited by Brian Keene, 2002
"The Ten-in-One" in The Swamp June issue (webzine) edited by Pete Allen, 2002
"Opportunity Knocks" in Penumbric Speculative Fiction edited by Jeff Georgeson, 2003
"The Day the Leash Gave Way" in Aphelion, May issue edited by Robert Moriyama, 2005
"Divadavidavida" in Susurrus: The Literature of Madness, February issue edited by Brian Worley, 2006
"Found Money" in Futures Mysterious Anthology Magazine, September/October issue, edited by Marlene Satter, 2006
"Bathing Beauty" (2009)
"Hooch" (2009)
"Sparkle Head" (2009)
"The House of Happy Mayhem" (2009)
"Two-Thirty-Six" (2009)
"Nothingness Dust" in Kizuna: Fiction for Japan edited by Brent Millis, (2011)
"Snow Blind" in Stupefying Stories, December issue edited by Bruce Bethke, 2011
"The Digital Eidolon That Fits in Your Pocket" in Fantastic Stories of the Imagination''' edited by Warren Lapine, 2012
"Black Whispers" in World's Collider: A Shared-World Anthology edited by Richard Salter, 2012
"Buckle Box" in The Original Van Goghs Ear Anthology edited by Tina Hall, September 9, 2012
"Short of Breath: A Halloween Short Story" published by Cemetery Dance Publications, 2012
"Slink" in Evil Jester Digest, Volume 2 edited by Peter Giglio, 2012
"Windows in the Wreckage" in Evil Jester Digest, Volume 2 edited by Peter Giglio, 2012
"The Rag-End of Dreams" in Nightscapes: Vol. 1 edited by Mark C. Scioneaux, Robert S. Wilson and Jennifer Wilson, 2013
"City Song" (with Edward Morris) in Dark Visions: A Collection of Modern Horror – Volume Two edited by Anthony Rivera and Sharon Lawson, 2013
"Quarter, Quarter, How I Wonder" in Lucky 13: Thirteen Tales of Crime & Mayhem edited by Edward J. McFadden III, 2014
"Parts Unknown" in The Big Click, Issue 19, edited by Jason Ridler, 2015
"The Dead Letter Office" (with Brian Knight) in Borderlands Vol. 6'' edited by Thomas F. Monteleone and Olivia Monteleone, 2016 (Bram Stoker Award winner, best anthology)
"Young Hearts" in Guns, edited by Gerald Hausman, 2016

References

External links
 Official website
 Trent Zelazny's Goodreads page

1976 births
Living people
American crime writers
American horror writers
American male short story writers
Writers from Santa Fe, New Mexico
American male novelists
21st-century American novelists
American people of Polish descent
American male dramatists and playwrights
21st-century American dramatists and playwrights
20th-century American short story writers
21st-century American short story writers
20th-century American dramatists and playwrights
20th-century American male writers
21st-century American male writers